Salem District is one of the 38 districts of Tamil Nadu state in southern India. The district is now divided into Dharmapuri, Krishnagiri, Namakkal as individual districts. Salem is the district headquarters and other major towns in the district include Mettur, Thammampatti, Attur, Omalur, Sangagiri and Edappadi. That Salem dates to at least two thousand years ago is evident from the discovery of silver coins from the Roman Emperor Nero Claudius Caesar Augustus Germanicus (37–68 CE) found by Koneripatti of Salem in 1987. It was ruled by Mazhavar King Kolli Mazhavan and kings Adhiyaman and Valvil Ori of Sangam age. It is part of Mazhanadu, a vast region that dates to the second century BCE. Salem was the largest district of Tamil Nadu. It was bifurcated into Salem and Dharmapuri districts in 1965 and Namakkal district in 1997. Now Salem has been developed a lot by building many bridges and is considered to be the smart city. Salem is famous for cultivating mangoes.

Politics  

|}

Administration
There are 4 revenue divisions, 13 taluks, 1 municipal corporation, 6 municipalities, 21 revenue blocks, and 32 town panchayats in Salem district.

Revenue divisions
Salem
Attur
Mettur
Sangagiri

Taluks
 Attur taluk
 Gangavalli taluk
 Idappadi taluk
 Kadayampatti taluk
 Mettur taluk
 Omalur taluk
 Peddanayakkan Palayam taluk
 Salem taluk
 Salem South taluk
 Salem West taluk
 Sangagiri taluk
 Vazhapadi taluk
 Yercaud taluk
 Thalaivasal taluk

Municipal corporations and municipalities
Salem City Municipal Corporation
Edappadi
Attur, Salem
Mettur
Narasingapuram, Salem
Tharamangalam
Edaganasalai

Revenue blocks
Salem
Veerapandi
Thalaivasal
Gangavalli
Panaimarathupatti
Ayothiapattinam
Valapady
Yercaud
Attur
Pethanaickenpalayam
Nangavalli
Mecheri
Kolathur
Omalur
Tharamangalam
Kadayampatti
Sangagiri
Magudanchavadi
Konganapuram
Edappadi
Veppampoondi

Town Panchayats
Ayothiapattinam
Gangavalli
Thammampatti
Attayampatti
Jalakandapuram
Elampillai
Kannankurichi
Kolathur
Konganapuram
Mecheri
Omalur
Panaimarathupatti
Pethanaickenpalayam
Sivathapuram

Vazhapadi
Veerakkalpudur
Thiruvelviyur(a) Belur
Edaganasalai
Kadayampatti
Karuppur
Keeripatti
Mallur
Sentharapatti
Thedavur
Thevur
Veeraganur
Ethapur
Arasiramani
Nangavalli
Poolampatti
Attur

Demographics

According to 2011 census, Salem district had a population of 3,482,056 with a sex-ratio of 954 females for every 1,000 males, much above the national average of 929. A total of 344,960 were under the age of six, constituting 180,002 males and 164,958 females. Scheduled Castes and Scheduled Tribes accounted for 16.67% and 3.43% of the population respectively. The average literacy of the district was 72.86%, compared to the national average of 72.99%. The district had a total of 915,967 households. There were a total of 1,694,160 workers, comprising 247,011 cultivators, 396,158 main agricultural labourers, 132,700 in household industries, 785,161 other workers, 133,130 marginal workers, 9,993 marginal cultivators, 58,052 marginal agricultural labourers, 8,803 marginal workers in household industries and 56,282 other marginal workers.

At the time of the 2011 census, 88.48% of the population spoke Tamil, 6.08% Telugu, 2.48% Kannada and 1.58% Urdu as their first language.

Education
Salem district is home to the Periyar University and the Vinayaka Mission University. The district has many educational institutions including Government Arts College (autonomous), Government Arts College for Women, Government College of Engineering (autonomous), Sona College of Technology (Autonomous), Thiagarajar Polytechnic College (Autonomous), Indian Institute of Handloom Technology, Government Polytechnic College, Central Law College, Sarada Institutions, and Mohan Kumaramangalam College (Medical), Salem Film school, Salem. Schools include Sri Chaitanya Techno School, Holy Cross, Glazebrooke, Holy Angels', St. Johns, Cluny, Golden Gates, Emerald Valley, Senthil Public School, Vidya Mandir, Little Flower, CSI Higher Secondary School and St. Joseph Schools.

Law enforcement

Law and order is maintained by the Salem district Tamil Nadu Police, headed by a Police commissioner. Special units include prohibition enforcement, district crime, social justice and human rights, district crime records and a district-level special branch headed by a superintendent of police.

Salem district have central prison at Hastampatti. It's one of the oldest jail and can able to host 1431 in house prisoners.

Industries
The Salem handloom industry is one of the most ancient cottage industries and producing quality sari, dothi and angavasthram out of silk yarn and cotton yarn. In the recent past, home furnishing items are also woven, mainly for export purposes. More than 75,000 handlooms are working and the total value of cloth produced per annum is estimated at  500,000 million. With more than 125 spinning mills, with modern weaving units and garment units Salem established itself as one of the major textile center in Tamil Nadu. The history of handloom and spinning mills dates back to pre-independence period in Salem. But until 1960s there were fewer than 5 spinning mills. Private handloom weaving started thriving in the region along with the large scale cooperative sector handloom weaving and marketing units. Small scale hand dying units were started around the region to the industry. Around 1980s the textile industry grew significantly. Many major spinning mills and waste spinning units came up into existence. Many Handloom societies and dying houses were established. New and increased number of Power Loom units were mushroomed in the places like Gugai, Ammapet, Attayampatti, Mallasamudram, Vennanthur, Magudanchavadi, Rasipuram, Komarapalayam, Pallipalayam, Jalakandapuram and Elampillai.

The Salem region also houses the Tamil Nadu largest number of Sago industries which are engaged in the production Sago Foods and Starch. In Salem District alone, 34000 hectares of land is under tapioca cultivation which is the raw material for the sago industries and there are 650 units engaged in tapioca processing. In and around Salem the yield of tapioca is about 25-30 T/ha, highest in the World. National average is 19 T/ha and World average production stands at 10 T/ha. Hence it is called land of sago. In 1981, Salem Starch and Sago Manufacturers Service Industrial Co-operative Society Ltd (popularly called as SAGOSERVE) was established to promote the growth of sago industries. Nearly 80% of the national demand for Sago and Starch is being met by the Sagoserv.

Salem Steel Plant, a special steel unit of Steel Authority of India Ltd have their plant located in Salem which produces Cold rolled stainless steel and Hot rolled stainless steel/carbon steel. The plant can produce Austenitic, ferritic, Martensite and low-nickel stainless steel in the form of coils and sheets with an installed capacity of 70,000 tonnes/year in Cold Rolling Mill and 1,86,000 tonnes/year in Hot Rolling Mill. In addition, the plant has country's first top-of-the-line stainless steel blanking facility with a capacity of 3,600 tonnes/year of coin blanks and utility blanks/circles. Expansion and modernisation of Salem Steel Plant is ongoing. The plan envisages installation of Steel Melting and Continuous Casting facilities to produce 1,80,000 tonnes of slabs along with expansion of Cold Rolling Mill complex, enhancing the capacity of Cold Rolled Stainless Steel Products from 65,000 TPA to 146,000 TPA and an additional Roll Grinding Machine for Hot Rolling Mill for increasing production to 3,64,000 TPA. The total project area is 1130 acres and cost of the project is  17,800 million.

Southern Iron & Steel Company Ltd (joint venture with JSW Steel) the first integrated steel plant of India at a cost of  22,350 million, located near Salem for the production of TMT corrosion resistant bars/alloy steels. The Salem plant is the largest special steel plant in India aims to develop the Kanjamalai, Kavuthimalai and Vediappanmalai iron ore mines in Tamil Nadu on receipt of requisite approvals to improve raw material security. This will facilitate expansion of production capacity to 2 MTPA. It will also allow the unit to diversify into the production of value-added products such as annealed, drawn and peeled steel. The plant is continuously working to develop special grades for critical automotive applications.

The Madras Aluminium Company Ltd (MALCO) is part of Vedanta Resources Plc, a London Stock Exchange listed FTSE 100 diversified metals and mining major. MALCO has a state-of-the-art, coal-based Captive Power Plant at the same location which was commissioned in the year 1999. In the year 2004 MALCO augmented its smelter capacity from earlier 25,000 TPA to 40,000 TPA. It generates 100 MW power from 4 units of 25MW each through power plant located at Mettur, Tamil Nadu. Around 90% of the entire power generated is exported; the rest is used internally. Efficient plant operations enabled MALCO to achieve a higher plant load factor since existence.

The region around Salem is rich in mineral ores. Salem has one of the largest Magnesite, Bauxite and also Iron ore deposits in India. It has many magnesite factories operated by private and public sectors such as Burn Standard & Co, Dalmia Magnesites and Tata Refractories, SAIL refractories. The Leigh Bazaar market in Salem is the biggest regional market for agro products. Narasus coffee one of the famous coffee in Tamil Nadu, Nandhi Dall Mills the oldest flour mill company, BSP refineries (Usha Refined Sunflower Oil) are other few companies have their presence in Salem.

There is an exclusive Electrical and Electronics Industrial Estate in the Suramangalam area of Salem city. Coimbatore-Erode-Salem stretch was well known for Industries and Textile processings and it is announced as Coimbatore-Salem Industrial Corridor and further development works are carried by SIPCOT Linking.

Places of interest

Attur Fort
Dhasekar
Kurumbapatti Zoological Park
Mettur Dam
Tharamangalam Kailasanathar Temple
Mecheri Bathrakali amman temple
Poiman Karadu, Panamarathu patty
Poolampatty Water Place (Salem's Kerala)
Sowriyur
Thanthondrieswarar Temple, Belur
Yercaud
Koppu konda perumal malai, Pethanaickenpalayam
Sangagiri Fort
Salem Ramanujar Manimandapam, Erumapalayam
Anayampatty Swedha Nadhi Gangavalli, Gangavalli
Salem Kottai maari Amman Temple, Old Bus stand
Vinakaya Missions 1008 lingam Temple
 muttal falls 
 Suganeswarar temple
oothumalai murugan temple

See also
List of districts of Tamil Nadu

References

External links

 Salem District

 
Districts of Tamil Nadu